Markovac is a village in Serbia. It is situated in the Vršac municipality, in the South Banat District of the Autonomous Province of Vojvodina. The village has a Romanian ethnic majority. Over the last half a century, the village's population has steadily declined from 1042 in 1961 to less than a quarter of that, 249 people in the 2011 census.

Name

Geographical information 
 Area: 29  km²
 Altitude above sea-level: 156 m
 Population: 249
 Postcode:
 Telephone prefix: +381 13
 Autocode: VŠ

History
12th century BC ornitho-morphic pendants were found in Markovac-Grunjac.

The village was first time recorded in 1749. In that time it was part of the Banat of Temeswar, which was a separate province of the Habsburg monarchy. According to 1753 data, it was mainly populated by Romanians. In 1778, the Banat of Temeswar was abolished and village was included into Temesch County within the Habsburg Kingdom of Hungary. In 1848-1849, the village was part of autonomous Serbian Vojvodina and in 1849-1860 part of the Voivodeship of Serbia and Banat of Temeschwar. After the abolition of the voivodeship in 1860, the village was again included into Temesch County. In 1918, following the end of World War I, Markovac (as part of the Banat, Bačka and Baranja region) became part of the Kingdom of Serbia and subsequently part of the Kingdom of the Serbs, Croats and Slovenes (known as Yugoslavia since 1929). During World War II, from 1941 to 1944, the German Wehrmacht occupied the village. During this time, the village was part of the Banat region, which had special autonomous status within the German-occupied puppet state of Serbia. After World War II, Markovac was included into the new socialist Yugoslavia. Since 1944, it is part of autonomous Yugoslav Vojvodina, which was included into socialist Yugoslav Serbia in 1945. Since 2006, Markovac is part of an independent Serbia.

Ethnic groups
 In 2002, the population of Markovac was 329, by self-description 251 Romanians (76%); 33 Serbs (10%); 10 Hungarians; 2 Yugoslavians; 2 Czechs; 2 Croats; 2 Slovenians; 2 Gypsies.

Historical population 
1961: 1,042
1971: 817
1981: 717
1991: 570
2002: 329
2011: 249

Notable people 
 Romulus Gaita (b 1922 - d May 1996), father of Australian philosopher Raimond Gaita, lived in Markovac until 1935 when at the age of 13 he fled the village
 Darien Banda, Famous football player in Sweden

References

Slobodan Ćurčić, Broj stanovnika Vojvodine, Novi Sad, 1996.

See also
List of places in Serbia
List of cities, towns and villages in Vojvodina

Populated places in Serbian Banat
Populated places in South Banat District
Vršac
Romanian communities in Serbia